Charles Paul André Michel (7 November 1853, Montpellier - 13 October 1925, Paris) was a French art historian.

Biography 
He came from a Protestant family, and originally studied history at the University of Montpellier. From 1872 to 1876, he attended the University of Provence, where he obtained a law degree. Then, from 1877 to 1880, he was at the École Pratique des Hautes Études in Paris. While there, he also studied with Charles Blanc at the Collège de France, and Hippolyte Taine, at the École des Beaux-Arts.

Shortly after, he became an art critic for several magazines. From 1884, he was a regular contributor to the Gazette des Beaux-Arts and, from 1886, to the Journal des Débats. He taught art history at the 
École Spéciale d'Architecture from 1883 to 1893. He quit teaching to accept the position of assistant to Louis Courajod, curator of the Département des Sculptures at the Louvre. He succeeded Courajod in 1896, and began teaching at the École du Louvre. 

In 1900, he was named a Knight in the Legion of Honor. In 1918, he was elected to the Académie des Beaux-Arts, where he took Seat #8 in the "Unattached" section; succeeding Louis de Fourcaud, who had died in 1914.   

He left the Louvre in 1920 to become a professor of French art history at the Collège de France. His multi-volume magnum opus, Histoire de l'Art was left unfinished at his death.

References

 Biographical data and references @ AGORHA

External links
 Paul Vitry: "André Michel". In: Gazette des Beaux-Arts Vol.5, #12, 1925, pp.317–332 (Online).
 Biographical notes and critical analysis by Geneviève Bresc-Bautier @ the Institut National d'Histoire de l'Art
 Biography and references @ the Dictionary of Art Historians

1853 births
1925 deaths
French art historians
French curators
Recipients of the Legion of Honour
Members of the Académie des beaux-arts
People from Montpellier